The 2018 Pasig Pirates season is the 1st season of the franchise in the Maharlika Pilipinas Basketball League (MPBL).

Key dates
 June 12, 2018: Start of the regular season of the MPBL.

Current roster

Anta Datu Cup

Eliminations

Standings

Game log

|- style="background:#fcc;"
| 1
| June 13
| Caloocan
| L 81–91
| Bernzon Franco (15)
| Bernzon Franco (12)
| Enrile, Bautista (5)
| Caloocan Sports Complex
| 0–1
|- style="background:#fcc;"
| 2
| June 26
| Laguna
| L 75–83
| Marlon Monte (17)
| Richard Velchez (9)
| John Dominique Monteclaro (4)
| Pasig Sports Center
| 0–2

|- style="background:#fcc;"
| 3
| July 5
| Mandaluyong
| L 55–98
| Bernzon Franco (15)
| Bernzon Franco (11)
| Rod Ivan Cervantes (2)
| Blue Eagle Gym
| 0–3
|- style="background:#;"
| 4
| 
| 
| 
| 
|
| 
| 
| 
|- style="background:#;"
| 5
| 
| 
| 
| 
|
| 
| 
| 
|- style="background:#;"
| 6
| 
| 
| 
| 
|
| 
| 
| 
|- style="background:#;"
| 7
| 
| 
| 
| 
|
| 
| 
| 
|- style="background:#;"
| 8
| 
| 
| 
| 
|
| 
| 
| 
|- style="background:#;"
| 9
| 
| 
| 
| 
|
| 
| 
| 
|- style="background:#;"
| 10
| 
| 
| 
| 
|
| 
| 
| 
|- style="background:#;"
| 11
| 
| 
| 
| 
|
| 
| 
| 
|- style="background:#;"
| 12
| 
| 
| 
| 
|
| 
| 
| 
|- style="background:#;"
| 13
| 
| 
| 
| 
|
| 
| 
| 
|- style="background:#;"
| 14
| 
| 
| 
| 
|
| 
| 
| 
|- style="background:#;"
| 15
| 
| 
| 
| 
|
| 
| 
| 
|- style="background:#;"
| 16
| 
| 
| 
| 
|
| 
| 
| 
|- style="background:#;"
| 17
| 
| 
| 
| 
|
| 
| 
| 
|- style="background:#;"
| 18
| 
| 
| 
| 
|
| 
| 
| 
|- style="background:#;"
| 19
| 
| 
| 
| 
|
| 
| 
| 
|- style="background:#;"
| 20
| 
| 
| 
| 
|
| 
| 
| 
|- style="background:#;"
| 21
| 
| 
| 
| 
|
| 
| 
| 
|- style="background:#;"
| 22
| 
| 
| 
| 
|
| 
| 
| 
|- style="background:#;"
| 23
| 
| 
| 
| 
|
| 
| 
| 
|- style="background:#;"
| 24
| 
| 
| 
| 
|
| 
| 
| 
|- style="background:#;"
| 25
| 
| 
| 
| 
|
| 
| 
|

References

Pasig Pirates
Pasig Pirates Season, 2018